Events from the year 1632 in France.

Incumbents 
Monarch: Louis XIII

Events
 
 
 
 
 
 

 March 29 – The Treaty of Saint-Germain is signed, returning Quebec to French control after the English had seized it in 1629.
 July 23 – Three hundred colonists for New France depart Dieppe.
 September 1 – A rebellion against French king Louis XIII is crushed at the Battle of Castelnaudary. The leader of the rebellion, Gaston, Duke of Orléans, the brother of Louis XIII, surrenders.
 September 9 – Thirty Years' War – Besieged by Wallenstein at Nuremberg, Swedish king Gustavus Adolphus attempts to break the siege, but is defeated in the Battle of the Alte Veste.

Births
 January 1 – Claude de Choiseul-Francières, a Marshal of France (d. 1711)
 February 12 – Charles Aubert de La Chesnaye, businessman active in Canada (d. 1702)
 May 3 – Catherine of St. Augustine, nun and nurse of New France (d. 1668)
 June 10 – Esprit Fléchier, writer and Bishop of Nîmes (d. 1710)
 June 14 – Jean Gallois, scholar and abbé (d. 1707)
 August 13 – François-Séraphin Régnier-Desmarais, ecclesiastic (d. 1713)
 August 20 – Louis Bourdaloue, Jesuit preacher (d. 1704)
 September 12 (bapt.) – Claude Lefèbvre, painter and engraver (d. 1675)
 September 15 – Comte de Grignan, aristocrat (d. 1714)

Deaths
 

 
 October 30 – Henri II de Montmorency, French naval officer and Governor of Languedoc (b. 1595)

See also

References

1630s in France